The 1940 West Virginia Mountaineers football team was an American football team that represented West Virginia University as an independent during the 1940 college football season. In its first season under head coach Bill Kern, the team compiled a 4–4–1 record and outscored opponents by a total of 127 to 94. The team played its home games at Mountaineer Field in Morgantown, West Virginia. John Shonk was the team captain.

Schedule

References

West Virginia
West Virginia Mountaineers football seasons
West Virginia Mountaineers football